Leslie Michael O'Connor (August 31, 1889 – January 20, 1966) was an American lawyer and professional baseball executive. He was the assistant to the Commissioner of Baseball from January 1921 until the death of Commissioner Kenesaw Mountain Landis on November 25, 1944; then he filled the void as acting commissioner (technically, as chairman of the Major League Advisory Council) until the election of Happy Chandler as Landis' successor on April 24, 1945. After spending another six months in the commissioner's office as Chandler's top assistant, O'Connor became general manager of the Chicago White Sox of Major League Baseball from November 1945 through November 1948, and he later served as president of the Pacific Coast League.

Biography
Born in Chicago, Illinois, O'Connor was admitted to the bar and served in World War I as a member of the Judge Advocate General's Corps. When Landis was appointed Commissioner of Baseball in the wake of the  Black Sox Scandal, O'Connor became his top administrator, succeeding John E. Bruce, who had been the top administrator for the National Baseball Commission. O'Connor served at Landis' side for 24 seasons until the commissioner's sudden death in 1944. As Landis' right-hand man, he was involved in investigations, writing Landis' decisions and keeping records.  After five months as acting commissioner—head of the three-man council that included league presidents Ford Frick and Will Harridge—during the waning months of World War II, O'Connor stepped aside for Chandler and was his top aide during the transition until after the  baseball season.

He then was named general manager of the White Sox by team owner Grace Comiskey and held that post for three losing campaigns. The team won 195 games and lost 262 (.427) during O'Connor's tenure as GM.

He remained in baseball, however, as a member of the Major-Minor League Executive Council, and then as legal counsel for and president of the top-level Pacific Coast League. As PCL president from 1956 through 1959, he was in office during the tumultuous shift of the Dodgers and Giants from New York City to Los Angeles and San Francisco, which resulted in a significant alteration of the PCL map. During O'Connor's four-year term, the league replaced four teams located in the metro areas of those cities with clubs in Vancouver (Oakland Oaks), Salt Lake City (Hollywood Stars), Phoenix (San Francisco Seals) and Spokane (Los Angeles Angels).

O'Connor died in Tokyo at the age of 76 while on a visit to Japan.

References

1889 births
1966 deaths
20th-century American lawyers
Baseball executives
Chicago White Sox executives
Lawyers from Chicago
Major League Baseball executives
Major League Baseball general managers
Minor league baseball executives
Pacific Coast League